Vigo Township is one of ten townships in Knox County, Indiana. As of the 2010 census, its population was 4,031 and it contained 2,063 housing units.

History
Vigo Township was established in 1837. It was named for Col. François Vigo.

Geography

Education
Vigo Township residents may obtain a free library card from the Bicknell-Vigo Township Public Library.

References

External links
 Indiana Township Association
 United Township Association of Indiana

Townships in Knox County, Indiana
Townships in Indiana